Valsala Menon (born 1945) is an Indian actress who works in Malayalam films. She has acted in over 200+ films. Currently she is active in Malayalam television serials.

Early life
Valsala Menon was born in 1945 to Raman Menon and Devakiyamma in Thrissur District. She has three elder brothers. Since early childhood she has learned classical dancing and has performed on various stages in the august audience of leaders and rulers of the time. She came into industry as a child artist Baby Valsala in Malayalam movie Thiramala in 1953. She got married at the age of 16 and settled at Bombay. She became Miss Thrissur in 1970 after giving birth to three children. She had taken dance, Malayalam classes in Bombay. She was active in Ladies Club also, there. Although there was innumerable offers for her to act in films post her marriage, she made a comeback to films in Kiratham released in 1985 once her children had finished their schooling and was on their own. She became noted through Parinayam 1994. Since then she is acting in movies in supporting characters . as well as in a number of tele serials in character roles. She has also appeared in advertisements.

Personal life
She was married to Late Kalappurakal Haridas in 1961. Haridas was working as an engineer at Bombay. The couple have three sons Prakash, Prem and Priyan. Prakash Menon is working in Australia, Prem Menon in Singapore and Priyan Menon in Kochi. Her husband died in 1991.

Partial filmography 

 Malayalam films
 Kalyanamaman
 Nattuchaneram Engum Koorakoorittu
 Voter 
 Naamam
 Penmana
 Students
 Snehakkoodu
 Solomante Manavatty Sophia
 Margazhikattu Town to Village 
 Panchali AD 
 Daivadashakam 2022 (album)
 Paykkappal 2022
 Kannadi  2022 as
 Bhoothakalam (2022) as Vinu's grandmother
 Keshu Ee Veedinte Nadhan (2021) as Keshu's mother
 Tsunami (2021) as Grandmother 
 Sufiyum Sujatayum (2020) as Sujata's grandmother 
Grandma Toy (2020) as (Short film) as Rugmini Thampuratti
Sundari Muthi (2020) as (Short film) as Sundari Muthi
 Gauthamante Radham (2020) as Gauthaman's grandmother
 Thrissur Pooram (2019) as Krishnaveni's grandmother
 Mamangam (2019) as Old Woman in Chandroth family
 Aakasha Ganga 2 (2019) as Kausalya Antharjanam
 Safe 2019 as Eshwari Amma
 Ottam 2019 as Ammachi
 Muthassikkoru Muthu  (2019) as Lakshmi Muthassi
 Muhabbathin Kunjabdullah (2019) as Abulla's mother
 Sachin (2019) as Mariyamma
 My Great Grandfather (2019) as Michael's grandmother
 Oru Kuprasidha Payyan (2018) as Hanna's grandmother
 Theetta Rappai (2018) as Ammini	
Mahabalipuram (2018) as (Short film)  
 Aami (2018) as Muthasssi
 Paathi (2017) as Muthassi
 Matchbox (2017) as Ambu's grandmother, Ammu
 Georgettan's Pooram (2017)
 Paulettante Veedu (2016) as Orphanage inmate 
 Marupadi (2016) as Suchamma
 Leela (2016) as Kumarakom Nalini
 Aadu Puliyattam (2016) as Black Magic Lady
 Action Hero Biju (2016) as Benitta's relative
 Pachakkallam (2016) as Muthassi
Oru Dhalam (2016) as (Short film) 
 Adi Kapyare Kootamani (2015) as old neighbour
 Appavum Veenjum (2015) as Margaret 
 Mayamaalika (2015) as Thampuratti
 Ben (2015) as Nun
 Kasthoorba (2015) as Kunjachutha
 Oru Second Class Yathra (2015) as Rosanna Thomas (photo only) 
 Haram (2015) as Isha's grandmother
 Uthara Chemmen (2015) as Muthiyamma
 Kanneer Mazhayathu (2015)  (Short film) 
 Malettam (2015) as Old lady
 Vellezhuthu (2015) 
 TP 51 (2015)
 Ithihasa (2014) as Janaki's grandmother
 Villali Veeran (2014) as Old lady
 Avatharam (2014) as Philomina
 Vegham 2014 .... Annamma	
 My Life Partner 2014 .... Mother Superior 
 Onnum Mindathe 2014 .... Sachithanandan's mother 
 Salaam Kashmier 2014 as Valyammachi
 1983 2014 as Sunny's mother
 Ottamandhaaram 2014
 Oru Indian Pranayakatha 2013 as Sidharth's grandmother 
 For Sale 2013 as Nayarambalam Vasantha
 Oru Yathrayil 2013 - {Segment:Amma} .... Nabeesa
 Kalimannu 2013 .... Paatti
 My Boss 	2012 .... Manu Varma's grandmother
 Arike 2012 .... Balu's mother
 Outsider 2012 .... Santha
 Matinee 2012 .... Savithri's grandmother 
 Oru Kudumba Chithram 2012.... Paatti
Ee Ammapooovu Oronappoovu 2012 .... (Short film) .... Amma
 Kudumbasree Travels 2011 .... Subhadramma
 Veeraputhran	2011 ... Middle Aged Woman.
 Kalabha Mazha 2011 .... Muthassi
 The Train	2011 .... Akku's grandmother
 The Filmstaar	2011 .... Pankajakshi
 Manushyamrugham 2011 .... Old lady
 Sandwich 2011 .... Sai's grandmother
 Sankaranum Mohanannum 2011 .... Sankaran's grandmother
 City Of God 2011 as Dasan's grandmother
Collector 2011 as Anish's grandmother
 Kunjettan (2011)
 Thaskaralahala 2010 as Annie Vincent
 Karayilekku Oru Kadal Dooram	2010 .... Anoop's grandmother
 T. D. Dasan Std. VI B	2010 .... Dasan's grandmother
 Aagathan 2010 .... Shreya's grandmother 
 Kutty Srank 2010 .... Paru
 Gulumaal: The Escape	2010 .... Actress
 Pazhassi Raja 	2009 .... Kaitheri Thamburatty
 Loudspeaker 2009 .... Annie's grandmother
 Passenger 2009 .... Sathyanathan's grandmother
 Sufi Paranja Katha 2009 .... Muthassi
 Swarnam	2008 .... Aachupennu
 Shakesphere MA Malayalam 2008 .... Pavithran's grandmother 
 Swapnangalil Haisel Mary 2008 ....
 College Kumaran 2008 .... Sreekutti's grandmother
 Anjil Oral Arjunan 2007 .... Arjunan's grandmother
 Heart Beats 2007 .... Hari's grandmother
 Avastha 2006  ....
 Raashtram 2006.... Kunjannamma
 Achuvinte Amma  2005 .... Kathreena
 Chanthupottu	2005 ... Sosamma
 Athbhutha Dweepu	2005 .... Devamma
 Ben Johnson  2005 .... Gouri's achamma
 Udayon 2005 .... Kunjujamma's mother
 Makalkku 2005 .... Gayathri
 Sancharram The Journey	2004 .... Ammachi
 Perumazhakkalam	2004 .... Paatti
 Vellinakshatram 2004 .... Muthassi (Valiya Thampuratti)
 Valathottu Thirinjal Nalamathe Veedu	2003 .... Bhuveneswari Amma
 Margam 2003 .... Menon's aunt
 Snehithan	2002 as Malavika's aunt
 Chathurangam 2002 as Sr. Theresa
 Desam 2002  as Vijyakrishnan's grandmother
 Krishnaa Gopaalakrishnaa 2002 as Gopalakrishnan's grandmother
 Valliettan	2000 as Sivakumar's mother
 Aanamuttathe Aangalamar 2000.... Devaki
 Vinayapoorvam Vidyaadharan 2000 ..... Sushamma
 Kochu Kochu Santhoshangal 2000 .... Ashalakshmi's grandmother
 The Warrant (2000)
 Gandharvaraathri 2000 .... Unnimaya's grandmother
 Pilots 2000  .... Boby's grandmother
 Olympiyan Anthony Adam 1999 .... Valyammachi
 Garshom (1999) as Aishu
 Janani (1999) as Sr. Gorothy
 Angene Oru Avadhikkalathu (1999) as Balakrishnan's grandmother
 Ennu Swantham Janakikutty	1998 ....Akkara Muthassi
 Bhoopathi 	1997 .... Mahendra Varma's wife
 Asuravamsam	1997 .... Sharada
 Niyogam 1997 .... Saraswathiyamma
 Guru 1997 .... Ramanagan's mother
 Oru Mutham Manimutham 1997
 Sallapam	1996 .... Leelavathi Thampuratti
 Udhyanapalakan 1996 .... Indu's grandmother
 Azhakiya Ravanan  1996 .... Omanakuttyamma
 Moonilonnu	1996 .... Gopi's mother
 Dilliwala Rajakumaran 1996 .... Maya's mother
 Kazhakam 1996 .... Radha's mother
 Sindoora Rekha 1995 .... Ramani's mother
 Kokkarakko 1995 .... Murali's mother
 Mazhayethum Munpe 1995 .... College Principal
 Thacholi Varghese Chekavar 1995 .... Subhadra
 Saakshyam 1995 .... Oppol
 Kaatttile Thadi Thevarude Ana 1995 .... Venu's mother
 Chaithanyam 1995 .... Karthyayani
 Agnidevan 1995 .... Ashram Head
 Parinayam 1994 .... Valiya Athemaru
 Sagaram Sakshi 1994 ....  Nirmala's mother
 Sainyam 	1993 ... .Eashwar's aunt 
 Ente Sreekuttikku 1993 .... Nandhini's mother
 Melepparambil Aanveedu 1993
 Agnishalabhangal 1993
Kanyakumariyil Oru Kavitha 1993
 Kamaladalam	1992 .... Dance Teacher at Kerala Kala Mandiram
 Nakshthrakoodaram 1992  .... Vishilakshi
 Kauravar 1992 ... Kunjaamina
 Avarude Sankhetham 1992 .... Suma's mother
Simhadhwani 1992 .... Soudamini
 Ulsavamelam 1992 .... Ammukuttiamma
 Kavacham 1992
 Apoorvam Chilar 	1991 ....Dr. Saramma
 Nagarangalil Chennu Rapparkkan 1991 .... House owner
Oru Prathyeka Ariyippu (1991)...Maheswari
 Cheppu Kilukkunna Changathi 	1991  .... Savithri
 Nayam Vyakthamakkunnu 	1991 .... College Principal
 Adayalam 	1991 .... Sarojini
 Kuttapathram 	1991 ... Clara 
 Kadinjool Kalyanam 1991 .... Bhavani
 Orutharam Randutharam Moonnutharam 1991 .... Lekha's mother
 Sundarikakka 1991 .... Alice
 Nagarathil Samsara Vishayam 	1991  .... Rajeswari
 Kaumaara Swapnangal 1991 .... Santhosh's mother
 Vasthuhara 1991
 Bali 1991
 Chuvanna Anki
 Koodikkaazhcha 1991
 Raid 1991 
 Aadhya Rathrikku Mumpu 1991
 Vashyam 1991
 Mukham 	1990 .... Usha's mother
 Aye Auto 	1990  .... College Principal 
 Veena Meettiya Vilangukal 1990 .... Sreenivasan's wife
 Pavakoothu 1990 .... Malathy Ramachandran
 Thoovalsparsham 1990 ....  Unnithan's wife
 Kuttettan  1990 .... Hostel Warden
 No.20 Madras Mail	1990 .... Sunny's stepmother
 Maalayogam 	1990 .... Narayani
 Ee Thanutha Veluppan Kalathu 	1990 .... Mrs. Davis
 Nagarangalil Chennu Raparkam 	1990  .... Martha
 His Highness Abdullah	1990 .... Madhavi Varma
 Nanmaniranjavan Sreenivasan 1990  .... Chandrika's mother
 Nammude Naadu 1990 .... Water taking lady
 Urvashi 1990 .... Agnez
 Paadatha Veenayum Paadum 1990 .... Sarasamma
 Rosa I Love You 1990 .... Rosa's grandma
 Kashandikku Marunumarunnu  1990
 Enquiry 1990
 Mazhavilkavadi	1989 .... Bhairavi
 Utharam	1989 .... Annie
 New Year 1989  .... Ajith's mother
 Season 	1989 .... TV buying lady
 Unnikrishnante Adyathe Christmas 1989 .... Parvathiyamma
 Naduvazhikal	1989 .... Dr. Rachel George
 Pradeshika Varthakal 1989 .... Elikutty
 Jeevitham Oru Raagam 1989 .... Savithri
 Ulsavapittennu 	1989 ....  Narayanikutty
 Carnivel 1989 .... Kamalamma 
 Kaalalppada 1989 .... Hostel Matron
 Ashokante Ashwathykuttikku 1989 .... Savithri
 Bhadrachitta 1989 .... Bhadra's mother
 Mudra 1989 .... Kalyaniyamma
 Varnatheru 1989  .... Mrs. James
 Unni 1989 .... Mrs. Thomas
 Rathibhavam 1989
 Moonnam Mura	1988  .... Bharathan Menon's wife 
 Orkkapurathu 	1988 .... Sherin's mother
 Aranyakam 	1988  .... Mohan's mother
 1921 	1988 .... Valiyamma
 Kandathum Kettathum 1988 .... Office worker
 Abkari 	1988  .... Madhavi
 Isabella  1988  .... Headmistress 
 Pattanapravesham 1988 .... Prabhakaran Thampi's wife
 Vaisali 1988 .... Old lady 
 Aparan 1988 .... Viswanathan's office staff
 Mattoral 1988 .... Shop keeper
 Mrithyunjayam 1988 .... College lecturer
 Oozham 1988 .... Seetha's mother
 Janmantharam 1988 .... Unni's mother
 Samvalsarangal 1988
 Vice Chancellor 1988
 Manja Manthrangal 	1987 .... Issac's mother
 Adimakal Udamakal 1987 .... Madhavi
 Thaniyavarthanam	1987 .... Balan's aunt
 Sruthi 	1987 .... Karthyayani
 Unnikale Oru Kadha Parayam  1987 .... Thomas Ebraham's wife
 Theertham  1987 .... Bank Manager
 Kaalam Maari Kadha Maari 1987 .... Kamarudden's mother
 Vilambaram 	1987 .... Valsala's mother
 Manasa Maine Varu .... Dance teacher
 Oridathu 1987 .... Rema's mother
 Neeyethra Dhanya 1987 .... Nun
 Itha Samayamayi 1987 .... Jagadhamma
 Ivide Ellavarkkum Sukham 1987 .... Sethu Raman's mother
 Vrutham 	1987 .... Charlie's Ammayi
 Athinumappuram 1987 .... Dr. Padma
 Kaanan Kothichu 1987
 Vaiki Odunna Vandi 1987
 Sunil Vayassu 20	1986 .... Sunil's mother
 Adukkan Entheluppam 	1986 .... Dr. Jameela 
 Uppu 	1986 .... Mariyambi
 Kariyilakkattu Pole 	1986 .... Actress's mother
 Pranaamam 1986 .... Damu's mother
 Mizhineerppoovukal	1986 .... Kuttimalu Amma
 Chekkeranoru Chilla 1986 .... Shobha
 Ente Entethu Mathram 1986 .... Mother Superior
 Kulambadikal 1986 .... Susan's mother
 Dheem Tharikada Thom 1986 .... Revathy's mother
 Atham Chithira Chothi 1986.... Kamala Nair 
 Ice-Cream 1986 .... Devaki
 Naale Njangalude Vivaaham 1986 .... Mini's mother
 Koodanayum Kattu   1986 .... Travel agency staff
 Njan Kathorthirikkum 	1986 .... Noorudeen's umma
 Onnu Randu Moonnu 1986 ... Mrs. Menon
 Karinagam 1986
 Ithu Oru Thudakkam Mathram 1986 
 Vivahithare Ithile Ithile 1986
 Karimpinpoovinakkare 	1985 .... Nurse
 Shatru 1985 .... Raghu's mother 
 Kiratham 1985 ... Kamalam
 Bheekararathri 1985 ...
 Thiramala  1953 ... Muthaiah's daughter

 Tamil films
 Arputha Theevu 2007 .... Devamma
 Aavarampoo 1992  .... Lakshmi

  Telugu films
 Anthima Theerpu 1988.... Advocate

Voice only 
 Thiruvambadi Thamban 2012 ....  Grandmother of Thampan (voice for Sreelatha Namboothiri)
 Krishnankutty Pani Thudangi (2021) as Unnikannan's grandmother's voice 
 Vidhi:The Verdict (2021) as Eliyamma (voice for Vijayakumari)

Serials

Other works

Drama 
 Gopuram
 Gitopadesham

Advertisements
 Mahalakshmi Silks

Reality Show
Nakshtradeepangal (Kairali TV)

Others TV shows
 Cinema One
 Charutha
 Matha Pitha Guru Daivam

Awards

Asianet Film Awards 2000- Special Jury -Garshom, Olympian Anthony Adam
  Minnalai Television Award  2006 - Best Supporting Actress
 Sakhi Puraskaram 2014
 Asianet Television Award 2014 -Lifetime Achievement Award -Parasparam (TV series)
 Kerala State Television Award for Best Supporting Actress 2019- Decemberile Aaksham
 True Indian Sukumari Smaraka Puraskaram 2020
 Honour by Samaadaram

References

Sources
 http://cinidiary.com/peopleinfo.php?sletter=V&pigsection=Actor&picata=2

External links
 
Valsala Menon at MSI

20th-century Indian actresses
21st-century Indian actresses
Actresses from Thrissur
Indian film actresses
Actresses in Malayalam cinema
1945 births
Living people
Indian child actresses
Date of birth missing (living people)
Indian television actresses
Actresses in Malayalam television
Indian stage actresses
Actresses in Malayalam theatre
Actresses in Tamil cinema
Actresses in Tamil television
Indian voice actresses
Child actresses in Malayalam cinema